The SsangYong Musso (Korean: 쌍용 무쏘) is a mid-sized SUV or pickup truck manufactured by the South Korean automaker SsangYong from 1993.

The Musso SUV was a result of collaboration between SsangYong and Daimler-Benz. The car's design was styled by Ken Greenley. The car has a double cab pick-up version named Musso Sports. The SUV produced from 1993 to 2005, and the pick-up produced from 2002 to 2005.

In Geneva 2018, SsangYong's new pickup truck was revealed, with the Musso nameplate. It features SsangYong's new body-on-frame platform, which shares with the SsangYong Rexton.

Musso SUV (FJ; 1993–2005) 

First produced in 1993, the Musso SUV was available with either a petrol 2.8 and 3.2-litre inline six-cylinder Mercedes-Benz M104 engine, a Mercedes-Benz M111 engine 2.3-litre inline four-cylinder petrol engine, or a 2.3-litre four-cylinder and 2.9-litre five-cylinder diesel engines (Mercedes-Benz OM601 and OM602) with natural aspiration or turbo intercooler (from 1997). The car was designed by Briton Ken Greenley and received the Auto Design Award from the Birmingham Auto Show hosted in 1994 and 1996. Also known for its off-road abilities, the vehicle won the Rallye des Pharaons for 4WD vehicles in October 1994. A facelifted version has been available since 1998.

The Musso seats five people, a folding trunk seat is available in rare models for a total of seven. The wheels are fit for off-road driving, similar to its smaller sibling, the Korando. The SsangYong Musso Sports, a Musso variant with a truck bed, was released in later years.

The Musso is available in Iran as Musso, produced by Morattab Khodro Co. (since 2003). It was sold in Vietnam by Mekong Auto Corporation from 1997 to 2005.

TagAZ Road Partner 
Russian automotive assembly TagAZ plant in Taganrog produced the Musso from 2008 to 2011 as TagAZ Road Partner. The car was facelifted in 2009.

Daewoo Musso 
The Musso had also been produced for the UK market by Ssangyong from 1995 until 1999, when Daewoo Motors took over. The car was rebranded as the Daewoo Musso, keeping most of Greenley's body style with a notable change being the new front grille, more suited to Daewoo's styling. The Daewoo Musso was also sold in Germany.

Production for the Daewoo Musso ended in the latter half of 2002, 2 years before Daewoo was rebadged by General Motors.

Musso Sports (P100; 2002–2006) 

The P100 series Musso Sports is a dual cab pickup version of the Musso SUV produced from 2002 to 2006. It features a Mercedes-Benz-designed engine, gearbox and five seats. Later models also had a turbo diesel option as well as others like a canopy, 'fins', extra tail lights, a chrome trim and an extra row of wheels to hold more weight.

Musso Pick-up (Q200; 2018–present) 

The Q200 series Musso is a Pickup Truck which debuted to Korean market and global market from Geneva Motor Show 2018. The car features SsangYong's new body-on-frame platform using Advanced High Strength Steel (AHSS), which shares with second generation of SsangYong Rexton.

The Musso is offered with a choice of a 225-horsepower 2.0 L e-XGDI 200T petrol turbo engine or 181 horsepower 2.2 L e-XDI 220 diesel engine which shares with the Rexton and available in two-wheel or part-time four-wheel drive. It is equipped with AISIN 6-speed automatic transmission or 6-speed manual transmission. The Musso pickup also provide Five-link suspension with optional Locking differential (LD). In Australia, the long wheelbase model XLV is also offered with rear leaf suspension in the base ELX model as standard and as an option in the mid spec Ultimate. In the United Kingdom, the long wheelbase model is known as the Musso Rhino, using the New Zealand market model name as a top of the range trim level.

Safety 
The Musso pickup equipped with six airbags, It also features smart safety driving system including Autonomous Emergency Brake System (AEBS),  Blind Spot Detection (BSD) and Rear Cross-Traffic Alert (RCTA).

References

External links 

 
  (Musso Grand)
 

Musso
Pickup trucks
Mid-size sport utility vehicles
2000s cars
Cars introduced in 1993
All-wheel-drive vehicles
2010s cars